Montpelier City Hall is located in Montpelier, U.S. state of Vermont. The four-story structure opened in 1909.

See also
 List of tallest buildings in Vermont

References

City and town halls in Vermont
Buildings and structures in Montpelier, Vermont